The Blue Ribbon Award for Best Actor is as part of its annual Blue Ribbon Awards for Japanese film, to recognize a male actor who has delivered an outstanding performance in a leading role.

List of winners

References

External links
Blue Ribbon Awards on IMDb

Awards established in 1950
Recurring events established in 1950
1950 establishments in Japan
Actor
Film awards for lead actor